Zerhouni is a surname. Notable people with the surname include:

Elias Zerhouni (born 1951), Algerian-born American scientist, radiologist, and biomedical engineer
Naoufel Zerhouni (born 1995), Moroccan footballer
Yazid Zerhouni (1937–2020), Algerian politician